Catiline His Conspiracy is a Jacobean tragedy written by Ben Jonson. It is one of the two Roman tragedies that Jonson hoped would cement his dramatic achievement and reputation, the other being Sejanus His Fall (1603).

Background
Jonson was not the first playwright of his era to dramatize the story of Catiline. Stephen Gosson in his "School of Abuse" (1579) praised a play called Catiline's Conspiracies, which was acted by Leicester's Men at The Theatre sometime between 1576 and 1579. A Catiline (either Gosson's or another play, author unknown) was acted at the home of William Cecil, 1st Lord Burghley on 16 January 1588. In 1598 or 1599, the Diary of Philip Henslowe records an advance payment of 5 shillings to Henry Chettle, for a play titled Catiline's Conspiracy—though Chettle appears never to have completed writing it.

Publishing
The play was first published in quarto in 1611 by the stationer Walter Burre, prefaced with commendatory verses by Francis Beaumont, John Fletcher, and Nathan Field. It was reprinted the 1616 folio of Jonson's works. The folio text states that Catiline was first performed in 1611 by the King's Men, and lists the cast as: Richard Burbage, John Heminges, Alexander Cooke, Henry Condell, John Lowin, John Underwood, William Ostler, Nicholas Tooley, Richard Robinson, and William Ecclestone.

Story
As its title indicates, the play recounts the story of Catiline, the Roman politician and conspirator of the 1st century B.C. Besides Catiline appear other historical figures such as Julius Caesar, Sempronia, Fulvia, Crassus and Cicero.

Reception
That the play was not a popular success is indicated by Jonson's reproachful preface to the published edition. Thomas Rymer praised the play's subject matter but condemned Jonson's violations of decorum. The Guardian states that: "Although booed off stage at its 1611 premiere, it became a great favourite in its day, but has not been staged since the 17th century".

John Dryden introduced the traditional prescriptive rule against preposition stranding in English in criticising a phrase from this play: "The maws, and dens of beasts could not receive / the bodies that those souls were frighted from."

In 2011, the play was edited and translated for the first time in Italian.

Notes

References
Chambers, E. K. The Elizabethan Stage. 4 Volumes, Oxford, Clarendon Press, 1923.
Halliday, F. E. A Shakespeare Companion 1564–1964. Baltimore, Penguin, 1964.

Plays by Ben Jonson
English Renaissance plays
1611 plays
Plays set in the Roman Republic
Cultural depictions of Catiline
Cultural depictions of Cicero
Depictions of Julius Caesar in plays
Cultural depictions of Sempronia (wife of Decimus Brutus)